The Cerny culture is a Neolithic culture in France that dates to the second half of the 5th millennium B.C. and that is particularly prevalent in the Paris Basin. It is characterized by monumental earth mounds, known as long barrows of the Passy type. The term is derived from the "Parc aux Bœufs" in Cerny in the department of Essonne who authorized the name.

Important sites 
Parc aux Bœufs, Cerny, Essonne
L'Étoile Neolithic Camp, L'Étoile, Somme, particularly highlighted by Roger Agache in Aerial archaeology, 1971
Maran Neolithic Camp, Châtenay-sur-Seine, Seine-et-Marne
Haut-des-Nachères Neolithic Camp, Noyen-sur-Seine, Seine-et-Marne
Le Gours aux Lions, Marolles-sur-Seine, Seine-et-Marne
Réaudins Enclosure and Balloy Necropolis, Seine-et-Marne, at the confluence of the River Yonne and River Seine.
Barbuise-Courtavant Camp, Barbuise, Aube
La Sabliere Necropolis, Passy-Richebourg, Département Yonne.
Escolives-Sainte-Camille, Yonne
Les Sablons, Gron, Yonne.
Noue Fenard, Vignely, Seine-et-Marne
Porte aux Bergers, Vignely, Seine-et-Marne
Orville Necropolis, Orville, Loiret, (Cerny-Videlles)
Site des Roches, Videlles, Essonne (Cerny-Videlles)
Buno-Bonnevaux Necropolis, Buno-Bonnevaux, Essonne

References

Literature 
 Roger Joussaume: La culture de Cerny: Nouvelle economie, nouvelle societe au Neolithique : actes du colloque international de Nemours, 1994

Neolithic cultures of Europe
Archaeological cultures of Western Europe
Archaeological cultures in France